Earl of Pembroke is a wooden, three-masted barque, currently used for maritime festivals, charters, charity fund raising, corporate entertaining and film work.

History

Early years 
Earl of Pembroke was built in Pukavik, Sweden as Orion in 1945 and used to haul timber in the Baltic Sea until 1974 when she was laid up in Thisted, Denmark.

Restoration 
She was moved to the UK in 1980 where her full restoration began in 1985. As part of the restoration, her rig was changed from the original schooner to barque type (to resemble the famous  on which Captain Cook discovered Australia) and she was renamed Earl of Pembroke (HMS Endeavour was called Earl of Pembroke when she worked as a coal trader in the West Country).

The restoration was designed with festivals and film work in mind. The three-masted rig and the uninterrupted decks containing no superstructure or wheelhouse create the silhouette of a classic sailing ship so she needs only minimal work to get a period correct aerial or side shot. With some effort she can also be made to look like an old Spanish Galleon or steam-sailing ship from the age of the Arctic expeditions.

Post restoration (festivals and film)
Following restoration Earl of Pembroke was used in the production of films and attended a number of festivals including:
 Brest Maritime Festival 2012
 Milford Haven Festival - Seafair Heaven
 Gloucester Maritime Festival 2015
 Southampton Boat Show 2015
 Belfast Titanic Maritime Festival 2016
 DelfSail 2016
 Dublin River Festival 2016
 London, UK - Sail Royal Greenwich 2016, 2017
 Drogheda Maritime Festival 2017
 Liverpool Maritime Festival 2017

She was used in the following films:
 Hornblower Series III
 Treasure Island
 A Respectable Trade
 Moll Flanders
 Beaumarchais,l'insolent
 Mary Reilly
 Cutthroat Island
 Shipwrecked
 Frenchman's Creek
 Shaka Zulu
 Longitude
 Wives and Daughters
 Count of Monte-Cristo
 L'Épervier, French television series
 Alice in Wonderland (2010 film)
 Cloud Atlas
 Alice in Wonderland: Through the Looking Glass
 Le Pacte des Loups (Brotherhood of the Wolf)

Final destination 
Scrapped at Hoeben RDM Schepen in Kampen, on December 2, 2022

Sail Plan 

 Mizzen 35.8
 Mizzen Staysail 19.9
 Mizzen Topmast Staysail 29.8
 Maincourse 86.6
 Main Topsail 101.3
 Main Topgallant 45.6
 Main Staysail 40.6
 Main Topmast Staysail 46.8
 Main Topgallant Staysail 37.7
 Forecourse 54.3
 Fore Topsail 89.6
 Fore Topgallant 44.9
 Inner JIB 25.9
 Outer JIB 29.0

Total sail area: 689 m2.

Gallery

References 

 Nils Nilsson: "Shipyards and Ship-Building at a Wharf in Southern Sweden". In: Ships and Shipyards, Sailors and Fishermen: Introduction to Maritime Ethnology by Olof Hasslöf, Henning Henningsen and Arne Emil Christensen Jr. Copenhagen, 1972.

External links

Earl of Pembroke Website 
BBC; Alice in Wonderland: Through the Looking Glass
 BBC; Cumbria Features Tall Ships - Earl of Pembroke
Earl of Pembroke Facebook Page
Metaco LLP - Earl of Pembroke Owners
Bristol-Culture
SouthWestBusiness
Port of Milford Haven

Barques
Individual sailing vessels
Ships built in Sweden
Tall ships of Sweden
Tall ships of Denmark
Tall ships of the United Kingdom
Lumber schooners
1945 ships
Merchant ships of Sweden
Merchant ships of Denmark
Ships and vessels on the National Register of Historic Vessels
Tall ships